The Sonning Prize is a Danish culture prize awarded biennially for outstanding contributions to European culture. It is named after the Danish editor and author Carl Johan Sonning (1879–1937), who established the prize by his will. 

A prize was first awarded in 1950 to Winston Churchill for furthering Anglo-Danish scientific interests.  However, a sequence of annual awards in this name was established in 1959 with the award to Albert Schweitzer followed by Bertrand Russell in 1960, the criterion being someone who  “has accomplished meritorious work for the advancement of European civilization”, and judged by a committee of the Senate of the University of Copenhagen.  From 1971 it was awarded every second year until 1991, starting again in 1994 till the present.

Prize winners are chosen by a committee chaired by the rector of the University of Copenhagen which decides on laureates from a selection of candidates proposed by European universities. The prize amounts to DKK 1 million (~€135,000) and the award ceremony is always held on or around 19 April (Sonning's birthday) in Copenhagen.

Sonning Prize laureates

See also

 List of awards for contributions to culture
 List of European art awards
 Léonie Sonning Music Prize

References

External links
Sonning Prize at the University of Copenhagen

Awards established in 1950
Danish awards
1950 establishments in Denmark
Awards for contributions to culture